The Distinguished Service Medal (DSM) is a military decoration of the United States Air Force and United States Space Force and is presented to airmen and guardians to recognize distinguished and exceptionally meritorious service to the United States while serving in a duty or position of great responsibility. The Distinguished Service Medal was created by an act of the United States Congress on July 6, 1960 and was first awarded in 1965. Prior to the creation of the Distinguished Service Medal in 1960, United States Air Force airmen were awarded the Army Distinguished Service Medal.

The Distinguished Service Medal is equivalent to the Army's Distinguished Service Medal, Naval Service's Navy Distinguished Service Medal, and the Coast Guard Distinguished Service Medal.

The interpretation of the phrase "great responsibility" means that this medal is generally awarded only to officers who hold at least the rank of major general.  However, as is customary for most military decorations, the requirements for the Distinguished Service Medal are interpreted more liberally when awarded upon retirement.  As a result, it is the typical decoration for a retiring brigadier general, and in recent years it has also been awarded to the  Chief Master Sergeant of the Air Force upon retirement. Cases of the award of this decoration to an individual who was not a general officer, or the Chief Master Sergeant of the Air Force, are unusual. Two notable exceptions are astronauts Colonel Buzz Aldrin and Colonel David Scott (who flew on Gemini 8, Apollo 9, and Apollo 15) who was awarded the medal twice.

Recipients during the medal's first 6 years included General Emmett E. "Rosie" O'Donnell Jr. (a United States Air Force four-star general who served as Commander in Chief, Pacific Air Forces from 1959 to 1963). O'Donnell also led the first B-29 Superfortress attack upon Tokyo during World War II after the 1942 Doolittle Raid. 
Another early recipient of the Distinguished Service Medal was Major General Osmond J. Ritland, USAF, who received his medal on November 30, 1965, upon his retirement.

Additional awards are denoted with oak leaf clusters.

This award is comparable to the Department of the Air Force Decoration for Exceptional Civilian Service given to civilian employees of the Department of the Air Force.

Notable recipients

General of the Army and General of the Air Force Henry H. Arnold
General Creighton Abrams - US Army Chief of Staff
General Philip M. Breedlove - NATO Supreme Allied Commander Europe
General Benjamin O. Davis Jr. — First African-American general officer in the United States Air Force
General Ira C. Eaker - Eighth Air Force Commander
General John W. Foss - Commander US Army Training and Doctrine Command
General Andrew Goodpaster - NATO Supreme Allied Commander Europe
General Lyman Lemnitzer - NATO Supreme Allied Commander Europe
General David C. Jones – Chairman of the Joint Chiefs of Staff
General Richard Myers - Chairman of the Joint Chiefs of Staff
General Peter Pace - Chairman of the Joint Chiefs of Staff
General Colin Powell - Chairman of the Joint Chiefs of Staff
General Joseph Ralston - NATO Supreme Allied Commander Europe
General Bernard W. Rogers - NATO Supreme Allied Commander Europe
General H. Norman Schwarzkopf – Commander US Central Command
General Eric Shinseki - US Army Chief of Staff
Admiral Jonathan Greenert - Chief of Naval Operations
Admiral Carlisle Trost - Chief of Naval Operations
Lieutenant General Brent Scowcroft – National Security Advisor
Major General Michael Collins – Command Module Pilot for Apollo 11
Major General Susan Pamerleau (USAF) (Ret.) – United States Marshal for the Western District of Texas
Brigadier General Jimmy Stewart – Actor and Air Force Reserve officer
Brigadier General Bud Day - Medal of Honor - Air Force Cross - Silver Star
Brigadier General Chuck Yeager – Legendary test pilot
Colonel Buzz Aldrin – Second man on the Moon
Colonel Frank Borman – Astronaut and Chairman of Eastern Airlines
Colonel David Scott - Seventh man on the Moon
Colonel John Warden – Architect of First Gulf War air campaign

See also
Defense Distinguished Service Medal
Distinguished Service Medal (U.S. Army)
Navy Distinguished Service Medal
Coast Guard Distinguished Service Medal
Awards and decorations of the United States military

References

Distinguished Service Medal
Awards and decorations of the United States Space Force
Awards established in 1960